The Appalachian State-Charlotte rivalry is multi-sport college rivalry series between the Mountaineers of Appalachian State University and the 49ers of the University of North Carolina at Charlotte. The two North Carolina public universities are located within a two-hour drive of each other and have competed against each other in athletic contests since 1971.

Football

Appalachian State has dominated the football series, winning every game by at least 15 points. The next match up is scheduled for 2026, the first of a four-game series between the two schools.

Game Results

Basketball

Basketball was the first sport the two schools met in, and is the sport that's seen the greatest number of games, with Charlotte claiming a 10-game advantage over Appalachian State. Statistically, Charlotte has dominated, with three of their last 5 wins in the series decided by double digits. Appalachian State has only won twice during that span.

Game Results

Baseball

The baseball rivalry is arguably the most heated between athletic departments. Because of the close proximity of the two campuses, the teams often schedule multiple games over multiple seasons before taking around a decade-long hiatus, and then scheduling a lot more games.

Game Results

References

College sports in North Carolina
College sports rivalries in the United States
College football rivalries in the United States
College basketball rivalries in the United States
College baseball rivalries in the United States
Appalachian State Mountaineers
Charlotte 49ers
1971 establishments in North Carolina